Royal Air Force Stormy Down, or more simply RAF Stormy Down is a former Royal Air Force station located near Pyle, Bridgend and opened in 1940.

History

It was an armament training school for the Royal Air Force (RAF) then after they departed the French took the station over and later American forces were also stationed at 'Stormy'.  Flying ceased in August 1944 due to the dangerous grass landing strip. However the airfield continued to be used for occasional private aircraft and a glider club for a number of years.

Stormy Down parented the RAF marine base at Porthcawl harbour. Once Stormy Down closed, the Sea Rescue unit at Porthcawl was parented by St Athan.  Known as 1105 Marine craft unit, it had three 43 ft range safety launches. It was still operating in 1958.
Stormy Down ceased use as a flying station because the chalk was collapsing due to the rain. Once the RAF personnel left it became a French Air Force and Naval Aviation Initial Training school. The airfield continued in use by an Air Training Corps gliding school and then a gliding club. There was only one aircraft landing there after the field shut and the pilot was lucky to escape prosecution.
The only American involvement was the garaging of two Piper Cub reconnaissance aircraft from Porthcawl.

Units

The following units were at Stormy Down at some point:
 No. 2 Service Flying Training School RAF
 No. 3 Service Flying Training School RAF
 No. 7 Air Gunners School RAF
 No. 7 Air Observers School RAF
 No. 7 Bombing & Gunnery School RAF
 No. 7 Service Flying Training School RAF
 No. 9 Armament Training Station RAF
 No. 9 Service Flying Training School RAF
 No. 14 Operational Training Unit RAF
 No. 23 (French) Initial Training Wing
 No. 32 (French) Personnel Reception Centre
 No. 68 Gliding School RAF

Current use

The site is now used by Cenin Concrete Products Ltd, as a Research, Development & Production Centre. The site is also the operating base for Bridgend Motorcycle Training Centre. The site is also used for a weekly car boot sale. A proposal to site wind turbines on the disused airfield has been made and a solar energy facility built on the site.

References

Citations

Bibliography

External links
Photos of the site

Royal Air Force stations in Wales